Brinnington railway station serves Brinnington in the eastern part of Stockport, Greater Manchester, England.

It is a relatively new station, opening on 12 December 1977, by British Rail, on the line originally built by the Sheffield and Midland Railway Companies' Committee in 1875 between New Mills and Manchester London Road (now Piccadilly).

Facilities
The station has a staffed ticket office at street level, which is opened through the day on weekdays (06:30-20:50) and on Saturdays until early afternoon (07:20-14:25).  Outside these times, tickets must be bought from the ticket machine or a promise to pay obtained.  Platform-level amenities are limited to waiting shelters, timetable posters, digital CIS displays and bench seating.  Automated train announcements are also provided.  Access to the platforms is via footbridge and inclined ramps - these have steps, but can be negotiated by wheelchair users with assistance.

Service

It is served by the DMU service operating between Manchester Piccadilly, Marple and New Mills Central with through services to Sheffield via the Hope Valley Line.

On Mondays to Saturdays, there are two trains per hour westbound to Manchester Piccadilly with two going eastbound.  Of these two eastbound trains, one per hour travels to New Mills Central and the other runs through to Sheffield. On Sundays, trains run every hour each way between Manchester Piccadilly and Sheffield.

References

External links

Railway stations in the Metropolitan Borough of Stockport
DfT Category E stations
Railway stations opened by British Rail
Railway stations in Great Britain opened in 1977
Northern franchise railway stations